The Convent of the Good Shepherd was a reformatory for girls in East Finchley, London. The order moved to East End house in 1864, and in 1873 the building became a reformatory for former female prisoners. The convent was largely destroyed in a fire in 1972 and the grounds were redeveloped into Bishop Douglas School in 1963 and the Thomas More Estate in 1980.

The surviving villa to the convent is a grade II listed building.

References

External links
http://lifeinlondon-londonlife.blogspot.co.uk/2010/02/history-of-east-finchley.html
http://www.british-history.ac.uk/vch/middx/vol6/pp86-87

Finchley
Grade II listed buildings in the London Borough of Barnet